Die neue Marlene is a studio album by Marlene Dietrich, released by Electrola in 1965. It was issued in the UK on His Master's Voice and released in the US by Capitol Records under the title Marlene — Songs in German by the Inimitable Dietrich. The album peaked at #34 in the German charts. The song "Die Antwort weiß ganz allein der Wind" was released as a single with "Sag mir, wo die Blumen sind" as its B-side.

Track listing

See also
 Marlene Dietrich discography

References

1965 albums
German-language albums
Marlene Dietrich albums